Evan Jenkin Edwards (14 December 1898 – 1958) was a Welsh footballer who scored 28 goals from 194 appearances in the Football League playing at outside left for Merthyr Town, Wolverhampton Wanderers, Swansea Town, Northampton Town, Darlington and Clapton Orient in the 1920s. He was on the books of Halifax Town without representing them in the League, and also played for Southern League clubs Mid-Rhondda United and Ebbw Vale.

Edwards played for Wales in an amateur international match against England Amateurs in 1920. According to the Daily Express report, "E.J. Edwards, the Merthyr outside left, was the star artist  of the Welsh attack, and his elusive runs and centres were a feature of the first half, but following change of ends he was kept well under control"; his team lost 9–0.

Notes

References

1898 births
1958 deaths
People from Bedlinog
Sportspeople from Merthyr Tydfil County Borough
Welsh footballers
Association football forwards
Merthyr Town F.C. players
Wolverhampton Wanderers F.C. players
Mid Rhondda F.C. players
Swansea City A.F.C. players
Northampton Town F.C. players
Halifax Town A.F.C. players
Ebbw Vale F.C. players
Darlington F.C. players
Leyton Orient F.C. players
Southern Football League players
English Football League players
Date of death missing
Place of death missing
Wales amateur international footballers